Mitja Janc (born 5 April 2003) is a Slovenian handball player who plays for RK Celje. He is the younger brother of fellow handball player Blaž Janc.

He participated at the 2021 European Men's U-19 Handball Championship, where he became the top scorer and was selected as the most valuable player. In addition, he was selected in the all-star team as the best centre back. He also participated at the 2022 European Men's Under-20 Handball Championship.

References

2003 births
Living people
People from Brežice
Slovenian male handball players
21st-century Slovenian people